Germany is competing at the 2013 Summer Universiade in Kazan, Russia from 6 July to 17 July 2013. 154 athletes are a part of the German team.

Germany has won 19 medals, including 4 gold medals.

References

Nations at the 2013 Summer Universiade
Germany at the Summer Universiade